The 35th Battalion, CEF was an infantry battalion of the Canadian Expeditionary Force during the Great War.

History 
The 35th Battalion was authorized on 7 November 1914 and embarked for Britain on 16 October 1915. The battalion was redesignated the 35th Reserve Battalion, CEF on 9 February 1915, and provided reinforcements to the Canadian Corps in the field until 4 January 1917 when its personnel were absorbed by the 4th Reserve Battalion, CEF. The battalion was disbanded on 8 December 1917.

The 99th Battalion (Essex), CEF was authorized on 22 December 1915 and embarked for Great Britain on 31 May 1916, where, on 6 July 1916, its personnel were absorbed by the 35th Reserve Battalion.

The 35th Battalion recruited and was mobilized at Toronto, Ontario.

The 35th battalion had two Officers Commanding:

Lt.-Col. F.C. McCordick, 16 October 1915 – 24 October 1916
Maj. F.H. Dunham, 24 October 1916 – 4 January 1917

The 35th Battalion was awarded the battle honour THE GREAT WAR 1915-17.

Perpetuation 
The 35th Battalion, CEF, is perpetuated by The Queen's York Rangers (1st American Regiment) (RCAC).

See also 

 List of infantry battalions in the Canadian Expeditionary Force

References

Sources
Canadian Expeditionary Force 1914-1919 by Col. G.W.L. Nicholson, CD, Queen's Printer, Ottawa, Ontario, 1962

035
Military units and formations of Ontario
Queen's York Rangers (1st American Regiment)